"I'm Old Fashioned" is a 1942 song composed by Jerome Kern, with lyrics written by Johnny Mercer.

I'm Old Fashioned may also refer to:

 I'm Old Fashioned (album), a 1976 album by Japanese saxophonist Sadao Watanabe
 I'm Old Fashioned (ballet), a 1983 ballet by Jerome Robbins

See also
 Old-fashioned (disambiguation)